The My Charmer Handicap is an American ungraded Thoroughbred horse race run annually on the turf course at Gulfstream Park West in Hallandale Beach, Florida.

Open to fillies and mares three-years-old and up, it is set at a distance of one and one-eighth miles (9 furlongs) and currently offers a purse of $100,000.

The My Charmer is the first of four $100,000 stakes on Calder’s Grand Slam I card, along with the Three Ring Stakes, the Foolish Pleasure Stakes, and Grade 3 Tropical Turf Handicap.

This race is named for My Charmer, the dam of U.S. Triple Crown champion, Seattle Slew. She also produced the important European sire Seattle Dancer who had sold as a yearling at the Keeneland Sales for US$13.1 million, the highest amount ever paid for a yearling at public auction.  As well, My Charmer produced Lomond, the 1983 winner of the British Classic, the 2,000 Guineas.

In 2015 this race was run at Gulfstream Park West at a distance of one and one-sixteenth miles.

Past winners

 2017 On Leave (Irad Ortiz Jr)
 2016 - Isabella Sings (Edgard J. Zayas)
 2015 - Lady Lara (IRE) (Jose Lezcano)
 2014 - Daring Kathy (Abdiel Jaen)
 2013 - Valiant Girl (GB) (Matthew Rispoli)
 2012 - Kya One (FR) (Paco Lopez)
 2011 - Oregon Lady (Paco Lopez)
 2010 - Askbut I Won'ttell (Shaun Bridgmohan)
 2009 - no race
 2008 - Wild Promises (Aaron Gryder)
 2007 – J'ray (4) (Manoel Cruz)
 2006 – Amorama (5) (Manoel Cruz)
 2005 – Snowdrops (5) (Brice Blanc)
 2004 – Something Ventured (5) (John Velazquez)
 2003 – New Economy (5) (Rosemary Homeister Jr.)
 2002 – Wander Mom (4) (Eibar Coa)
 2001 – Batique (6) (Jorge Chavez)
 2000 – Wild Heart Dancing
 1999 - Crystal Symphony
 1998 – Colcon (Jerry Bailey)
 1997 – Overcharger (5) (Jose Rivera)
 1996 – Romy (5) (Francisco Torres)
 1995 – Danish 
 1994 – Caress
 1993 – Chickasha (4)
 1992 – Lady Shirl (5) (Earlie Fires)

External links
 Calder Race Course

Gulfstream Park
Calder Race Course
Horse races in Florida
Ungraded stakes races in the United States
Previously graded stakes races in the United States
Turf races in the United States
Mile category horse races for fillies and mares
Recurring sporting events established in 1984